The Son of Bigfoot (also released internationally in English as Bigfoot Junior) is a 2017 English-language Belgian-French computer-animated comedy-drama film directed by Ben Stassen and Jeremy Degruson. Upon release, the film received positive reviews from critics and grossed $50 million worldwide against its $20 million budget. As of March 2018, the film had topped 8 million admissions worldwide. The film was released on DVD on May 1, 2018, in the United States.

A sequel titled Bigfoot Family (also known as Bigfoot Superstar) was released on August 5, 2020.

Plot
HairCo. is a megacorporation run by Wallace Eastman that specializes in improving people's hair. His helicopter chases after a scientist named Dr. Harrison who escapes by jumping into a river.

12 years later, a young boy named Adam Harrison the son of Dr. Harrison, lives with his mother, Shelly but keeps getting harassed by the local bullies Tony, Dale, and Garcia for being unjustly judged by other students and being the mutual crush of a kindhearted girl named Emma. Over time, he also notices that strange things start happening to him, like his feet growing bigger so his toes stick out of his shoes and that his hair growing right back over night even after his mother gave it a complete chop.

After discovering not only the fact that his father is alive, but also his current location from a box his mother Shelly had kept hidden, Adam sets out on an epic and daring quest to uncover the mystery behind his long-lost dad only to find out that he is none other than the legendary Bigfoot who has been hiding deep in the forest for years to protect himself and his family from Eastman who is eager to run scientific experiments with his special DNA. What neither of them knew was that a truck driver named Fat Dan had nearly run over Adam. Bigfoot saved Adam, but Fat Dan got some footage of it and put it in the newspaper.

Adam discovers that he too is gifted with superpowers similar to his dad, like having large feet, supersonic hearing, running at incredible speeds and speaking to animals like Tina the red squirrel, Trapper the raccoon, his wife Weecha, Wilbur the Kodiak bear, and Steve the European green woodpecker .

Meanwhile, Eastman heard about the sighting, and although reluctant follows the traces to Bigfoot. In order to draw out Adam, Eastman arranges for his mother's car to be intercepted by a road block agent . The men roam the forest to search for more evidence. After Adam is apprehended, he sends them to a false site, where they fail greatly. This results using Adam as bait to lure Bigfoot, ending with Bigfoot being captured.

Eastman and his scientist Dr. Billingsley begin their experiment on Bigfoot who Eastman recognizes as Dr. Harrison. The hair sample is tested on Dr. Billingsley's usual intern who asks her to sign his volunteer paper. The sample causes the intern to grow extraordinarily long hair all over his body. With the help of the animals, Adam rescues his father, leading to the destruction of the HairCo. facility. Eastman is tranquilized by Shelly as Bigfoot states that he is done with hiding. Dr. Billingsley crawls out of the wreckage as his intern tries to get him to sign his volunteer paper.

Bigfoot returns home and the animals have taken to living with the family. A magazine cover shows that Wallace Eastman has been arrested for his illegal activities. On his way to school, Adam's bullies attempt to haze him again. Having gone on his journey, Adam calmly tells them that he has finally had enough and kindly asks to be left alone. When they refuse to comply, Adam tells his animal friends who scare them into leaving him alone while secretly dismantling their bikes and skateboard to make them crash to further punish them for their previous harassing of Adam which the latter sees and laughs at. Adam dismisses his animal friends as Emma spots the scene and asks about it. Adam asks if she would walk with him to school and she agrees while he begins to explain his life to her.

Cast
 Pappy Faulkner as Adam Harrison, a 12-years old boy who goes looking for his long-lost father
 Chris Parson as:
 Bigfoot / Dr. Harrison, Adam's father
 Guard at Desk
 Terrence Stone as Wallace Eastman, the CEO of HairCo. that pursues Bigfoot
 Marieve Herington as Shelly Harrison, Adam's mother
 Laila Berzins as:
 Weecha, a pregnant raccoon and Trapper's wife
 911 Operator
 Sandy Fox as Tina, a red squirrel
 Joe Ochman as:
 Trapper, a raccoon and Weecha's husband
 Tom
 Alan Shearman as Dr. Billingsley, a elderly scientist working for Eastman
 Michael Sorich as Wilbur, a Grizzly Bear
 Shylo Summer as Emma, Adam's love interest
 Joe J. Thomas as Steve the European green woodpecker
 Cinda Adams as:
 Secretary
 Waitress
 John Allsop as Agent #2
 George Babbit as Truck Driver
 Tom Blank as Mr. Blakestone
 Barry D. Buckner as Garcia, one of Adam's bullies
 Joey Camen as Principal Jones, the principal of Adam's school
 Mari Devon as:
 Female Reporter
 Mildred
 Jeff Doucette as:
 Fat Dan, a truck driver that photographs Bigfoot saving Adam
 Tim
 Tech Support Operator
 David Epstein as Charlie
 James Frederick as Gate Guard
 Victor Friedland as Prison Guard
 Grant George as:
 Road Block Agent
 Forensic Expert
 Kyle Hebert as Simpson 
 Brody Hessin as an Intern who tries to get Dr. Billingsley to sign his volunteer paper
 Steve Kramer as Mr. President
 Lex Lang as Japanese Man #3
 Yuri Lowenthal as:
 Tony, one of Adam's bullies
 Japanese Man #2
 Nicholas Marj as Dale, one of Adam's bullies
 Domonic Paris as Guard Commander
 Tara Platt as Katrina
 Roger Craig Smith as White Rabbit
 Kirk Thornton as Japanese Man #1
 Victor Weaver as:
 Secret Service Agent
 Guard #2

Crew
 Domonic Paris - Voice Director

Sequel

In October 2018, Ben Stassen announced that a sequel was in the works, due out in mid 2020, which will take place a couple of years after the first movie. In June 2020, Bigfoot Family premiered at the 2020 Annecy International Animation Film Festival.

Reception
On review aggregator Rotten Tomatoes, the film has an approval rating of 76% based on 21 reviews, with an average rating of 5.6/10.

Ben Kenigsberg of The New York Times wrote: "More or less does what it sets out to do, which is to offer enough visual activity and bromides to keep the very young interested."

References

External links

 
 http://www.nwave.com/bigfoot-junior-is-here/
 http://noahicegem.blogspot.co.za/2017/08/forget-gold-bigfoot-movie-earned.html?m=1

2017 films
2017 3D films
2017 computer-animated films
Belgian animated films
French animated films
Animated films about bears
Animated films about children
Animated films about squirrels
Animated films about birds
Films directed by Ben Stassen
2010s French films
Films about raccoons
Yeti in fiction
Bigfoot films
Films about father–son relationships
StudioCanal films
StudioCanal animated films
Films set in 2016
Films set in 2004
Films set in Portland, Oregon
2010s English-language films